Cervera de los Montes is a municipality located in the province of Toledo, Castile-La Mancha, Spain. According to the 2006 census, the municipality has a population of 329 inhabitants.

References

External links

Municipalities in the Province of Toledo